Nanny McPhee is an American/British 2005 comedy drama fantasy film based on the Nurse Matilda character by Christianna Brand. It was directed by Kirk Jones, coproduced by StudioCanal, Metro-Goldwyn-Mayer Pictures, Working Title Films, Three Strange Angels, and Nanny McPhee Productions with music by Patrick Doyle, and produced by Lindsay Doran, Tim Bevan, and Eric Fellner. Set in Victorian England, the film stars Emma Thompson as Nanny McPhee, along with Colin Firth and Angela Lansbury.

The film was theatrically released on 28 October 2005 in the UK by United International Pictures and on 27 January 2006 in the US by Universal Pictures. Thompson also scripted the film, which is adapted from Christianna Brand's Nurse Matilda books. The filming location was Penn House Estate, Buckinghamshire, UK. A sequel, Nanny McPhee and the Big Bang, was released in 2010.

Plot
In Victorian Britain, widower undertaker Cedric Brown is the father of seven unruly children—Simon, Tora, Eric, Lily, Sebastian, Chrissie, and baby Aggie. He is clumsy and loves his children, but since the death of his wife, has spent little time with them and cannot handle them. The children have had a series of nannies, whom they have systematically driven out with their bad behavior and pranks. They also take great pleasure in tormenting their cook, Mrs. Blatherwick, a former military cook who declares that there will be "snow in August" before the family is put to rights. Besides their father, the only one the children will ever listen to is Evangeline, the family's uneducated but beautiful and sweet-natured scullery maid.

One day, Cedric discovers multiple references for a "Nanny McPhee" throughout the home. That same night during a storm, while the children cause havoc in the kitchen, Cedric opens the door to reveal a hideous woman, who introduces herself as Nanny McPhee. With discipline and a little magic, she transforms the family's lives. The children, led by Simon, try to play their tricks on her, but after failing, they gradually start to respect her and ask her for advice. Each time the children learn a lesson, one of Nanny McPhee's facial defects magically disappears. Over time, the children become more responsible, helping their clumsy father in solving the family problems, making Nanny McPhee less and less needed.

The family is financially supported by Cedric's domineering and short-sighted aunt-in-law Lady Adelaide Stitch, who demands custody over one of the children. She first wants second-youngest daughter Chrissie, but Evangeline volunteers to go and Adelaide agrees, assuming she is one of the daughters. She also threatens to reduce the family to poverty unless Cedric remarries within the month.

Desperate, Cedric turns to vile and frequent widow, Mrs. Selma Quickly. The children assume from reading fairy tales that all stepmothers are terrible women who treat their stepchildren like slaves; together, they sabotage Mrs. Quickly's visit, and she leaves, angry at Cedric. After the financial rationale for the marriage is explained to the children, they realize their mistake; the children appease Mrs. Quickly by confessing they were to blame for ruining her visit. Mrs. Quickly, intrigued when she hears about Adelaide's wealth and status, reconciles with Cedric and agrees to marry him. However, Mrs. Quickly deliberately breaks baby Aggie's beloved rattle, which previously belonged to their late mother.

At the gaudy wedding, the children pretend there are bees (inspired by the way Quickly told them to "behave," and baby Aggie repeating the word but pronouncing it as "beehive"), chase the guests, and start a food fight using banquet pastries. Cedric swiftly understands his children do not like the bride and, recognizing that she is not right for him or his children, joins in the commotion himself. Mrs. Quickly calls off the marriage and storms off in anger. When it seems that Adelaide's marriage deadline is missed, Lily suggests that Cedric marry Evangeline; the other children reveal to Adelaide that she is not, in fact, their sister. Evangeline and Cedric resist at first, but then realize their feelings for each other and agree to marry, satisfying Adelaide's conditions for maintaining her financial support. Nanny McPhee, now fully beautified, magically makes it snow in August, transforming the wedding scene and changing Evangeline's clothes into a wedding dress, and restores Aggie's rattle.

Nanny McPhee leaves surreptitiously, in accordance with what she told the children on her first night: "When you need me, but do not want me, then I must stay. When you want me, but no longer need me, then I have to go".

Cast

 Emma Thompson as Nanny McPhee
 Colin Firth as Cedric Brown, an undertaker and the widower patriarch of the Brown family.
 Thomas Sangster as Simon Brown, the eldest of the Brown children.
 Kelly Macdonald as Evangeline, the Browns' scullery maid, who dreams of being an educated lady.
 Angela Lansbury as Great-Aunt Lady Adelaide Stitch, the aunt of Cedric's late wife and the family's primary financial support.
 Eliza Bennett as Tora Brown.
 Raphaël Coleman as Eric Brown.
 Jennifer Rae Daykin as Lily Brown.
 Samuel Honywood as Sebastian Brown.
 Holly Gibbs as Christianna "Chrissie" Brown.
 Hebe and Zinnia Barnes play Agatha "Aggie" Brown, the youngest of the Brown children.
 Freya Fumic as the voice of Agatha Brown.
 Celia Imrie as Mrs. Selma Quickly, a frequent widow that Cedric intends to marry to appease Aunt Adelaide.
 Imelda Staunton as Mrs. Blatherwick, the Browns' military-minded cook
 Derek Jacobi as Mr. Wheen, one of Cedric's co-workers.
 Patrick Barlow as Mr. Jowls, one of Cedric's co-workers.
 Adam Godley as the vicar, who is allergic to bees.
 Claire Downs as Nanny Whetstone.
 Phyllida Law as the voice of Mrs. Partridge.

Production

On 11 March 2002 Kirk Jones was hired and set to direct Nanny McPhee based on Nurse Matilda by Christianna Brand. Emma Thompson wrote the script for the film. Lindsay Doran, Tim Bevan and Eric Fellner produced the film with the budget of $25 million for release in 2005.

On 22 April it was announced that Emma Thompson, Colin Firth, Thomas Sangster, Kelly Macdonald, Angela Lansbury, Eliza Bennett, Jennifer Rae Daykin, Raphaël Coleman, Samuel Honywood, Holly Gibbs, Celia Imrie, Imelda Staunton, Derek Jacobi, Patrick Barlow and Adam Godley joined the film.

On 16 May it was announced that Patrick Doyle would compose the music for the film. Development of the film was completed in Dorset, England. Filming ran 1 April – 9 July 2004. The film reunites Emma Thompson, Colin Firth, Thomas Sangster and Adam Godley who all previously starred in the 2003 film Love Actually. Thompson's work on this film prevented her from reprising her role as Frasier Crane's first wife, Nanny G. on his spin-off series, Frasier in the episode "Caught in the Act", so Laurie Metcalf played Nanny G. in the episode.

Release

The film was theatrically released on 28 October 2005 in the UK by United International Pictures and on 27 January 2006 in the US by Universal Pictures and was released on DVD on 9 May 2006 by Universal Studios Home Entertainment.

Reception

Critical response
Review aggregation website Rotten Tomatoes gives Nanny McPhee a score of 73% based on 135 reviews with an average rating of 6.7/10. The critical consensus reads, "A bit alarming at first, Nanny McPhee has a hard edge to counter Mary Poppins-style sweetness, but it still charms us and teaches some valuable lessons." Metacritic calculated an average score of 59 out of 100 based on 30 reviews, indicating "mixed or average reviews". Audiences polled by CinemaScore gave the film an average grade of "A-" on an A+ to F scale.

Box office
The film did well at the box office, earning $122,489,822 — $47,144,110 in the United States and $75,345,712 elsewhere. It premiered in the United States on 27 January 2006 with an opening weekend total of $14,503,650 in 1,995 theatres (an average of $7,270 per theatre) ranking at No. 2 (behind the Martin Lawrence film Big Momma's House 2).

Sequel
Emma Thompson revealed on Friday Night with Jonathan Ross that two more films were planned. The second film, Nanny McPhee and the Big Bang (also called Nanny McPhee Returns), was released in March 2010. It co-stars Rhys Ifans, Maggie Smith, Ralph Fiennes and Maggie Gyllenhaal. The character of Aggie Brown returns as the now elderly Mrs. Docherty. In it, Nanny McPhee takes charge of the children of a woman whose husband has gone to war.

A third film was planned to be set in modern-day Britain but, despite taking $93 million at the box-office, the sequel did not reach studio expectations and plans were cancelled for future films.

Stage musical

It was announced on April 12, 2018 that the movie will be adapted into a stage musical.

References

External links

 
 
 
 

2005 films
2000s children's fantasy films
2000s fantasy comedy films
British fantasy comedy films
Fiction about child care occupations
Films about witchcraft
Films based on children's books
Films directed by Kirk Jones
Films produced by Eric Fellner
Films produced by Tim Bevan
Films scored by Patrick Doyle
Films set in England
Films set in the Victorian era
Films shot at Pinewood Studios
Films with screenplays by Emma Thompson
Metro-Goldwyn-Mayer films
Fictional witches
Films about nannies
StudioCanal films
Universal Pictures films
Working Title Films films
British children's comedy films
2000s English-language films
2000s British films
Films about widowhood